David Evans (August 7, 1893 – May 20, 1966) was a British screenwriter and novelist. He entered the British film industry during the 1930s where he worked on a number of quota quickies. During the 1940s he was employed on several more prestigious films such as Terence Fisher's Portrait from Life (1948). From the mid-1950s he switched to the United States working on a final screenplay Strange Intruder (1956) before switching to television.

Selected filmography

 Boomerang (1934)
 You Must Get Married (1936)
 Landslide (1937)
 Against the Tide (1937)
 Macushla (1937)
 Wise Guys (1937)
 Passenger to London (1937)
 Member of the Jury (1937)
 There Was a Young Man (1937)
 The Five Pound Man (1937)
 Murder in the Family (1938)
 The Londonderry Air (1938)
 Second Thoughts (1938)
 Irish and Proud of It (1938)
 The Villiers Diamond (1938)
 Who Goes Next? (1938)
 What Would You Do, Chums? (1939)
 I'll Turn to You (1946)
 This Man Is Mine (1946)
 When You Come Home (1948)
 The Three Weird Sisters (1948)
 Snowbound (1948)
 Portrait from Life (1949)
 Midnight Episode (1950)
 Once a Sinner (1950)
 The Late Edwina Black (1951)
 The Third Visitor (1951)
 Strange Intruder (1956)

References

Bibliography
 Goble, Alan. The Complete Index to Literary Sources in Film. Walter de Gruyter, 1999.
 Nelmes, Jill. The Screenwriter in British Cinema. Bloomsbury Publishing,  2019.

External links

1893 births
1966 deaths
20th-century British screenwriters
20th-century British novelists
British emigrants to the United States
British male novelists
British male screenwriters